Corporal punishment in the United States may refer to:

 Corporal punishment of minors in the United States
 School corporal punishment in the United States
 Domestic corporal punishment in the United States
 Judicial corporal punishment in the United States